In enzymology, a cinnamyl-alcohol dehydrogenase is an enzyme that catalyzes the chemical reaction

cinnamyl alcohol + NADP+  cinnamaldehyde + NADPH + H+

Thus, the two substrates of this enzyme are cinnamyl alcohol and NADP+, whereas its 3 products are cinnamaldehyde, NADPH, and H+.

This enzyme belongs to the family of oxidoreductases, specifically those acting on the CH-OH group of donor with NAD+ or NADP+ as acceptor. The systematic name of this enzyme class is cinnamyl-alcohol:NADP+ oxidoreductase. Other names in common use include cinnamyl alcohol dehydrogenase, and CAD. This enzyme participates in phenylpropanoid biosynthesis.

Structural studies

References 

 
 
 

EC 1.1.1
NADPH-dependent enzymes
Enzymes of known structure
Phenylpropanoids metabolism